Final Four will be held on 25–26 March 2023 in Podgorica, Montenegro.

Semifinals

Third place

Final

Bracket

References

External links
Official website

Final Four